Chiloxanthinae is a subfamily of shore bugs in the family Saldidae. There are about 7 genera and more than 20 described species in Chiloxanthinae.

Genera
These seven genera belong to the subfamily Chiloxanthinae:
 Chiloxanthus Reuter, 1891
 Enalosalda J. Polhemus, 1969
 Pentacora Reuter, 1912
 Propentacora J. Polhemus, 1985
 † Brevrimatus Zhang, Yao & Ren, 2011
 † Oligosaldina Statz, 1950
 † Paralosalda J. Polhemus & Evans, 1969

References

Further reading

External links

 

  
Saldidae
Articles created by Qbugbot